The 7.5 cm Panzerabwehrkanone 50 or 7.5 cm Pak 50 was an anti-tank gun, produced in limited numbers by Germany, towards the end of World War II.

History
The 7.5 cm Pak 50 was developed during 1944 and details are scarce.  The rationale for the guns might have been to produce a lighter, more portable and easily concealable version of the Pak 40.  Despite its Panzerabwehrkanone designation, it may have been a dual-purpose gun with both anti-tank and Infanteriegeschütz or Infantry support gun roles.

Design
The Pak 50 consisted of a shortened 7.5 cm Pak 40 barrel and recoil mechanism mounted on the carriage of the earlier 5 cm Pak 38.  The carriage was a split-trail design with spoked metal wheels and solid rubber tires.  There was also a curved two-layer gun shield and the breech was a semi-automatic horizontal sliding wedge.  Once fired the breech would open and eject the spent casing and it remained open until the next round was loaded and the breech was closed and the gun was again ready to fire.  

Compared to the Pak 40 which had a  L/46 caliber barrel, the Pak 50 had a shorter  L/30 barrel. Available photographs of the Pak 50 show two different types of muzzle brake were used. One was a square three baffle design, while the other was a five baffle design. Compared to the IG 37 and IG 42 which weighed  the Pak 50 was much heavier and its maximum elevation of +27° was less than either of the infantry support guns.

Its lack of elevation would suggest it was a direct-fire instead of an indirect-fire weapon and its weight would indicate it fired a larger projectile than the infantry support guns.  It's possible it used a shell smaller than the fixed 75×714mm R shell from the Pak 40 and rather than firing a conventional armor-piercing round it could have fired a HEAT round.  The advantage is if it fired a HEAT round the size of the propellant charge, its muzzle velocity and amount of recoil could all be lessened since HEAT rounds rely on chemical energy to penetrate armor and not velocity.  However, the ammunition used and the gun's performance are unknown.

See also
5 cm Pak 38
7.5 cm Pak 40
7.5 cm Pak 97/38
7.5 cm Infanteriegeschütz 37
7.5 cm Infanteriegeschütz 42

References

External links
 http://i9.photobucket.com/albums/a100/zarax/75cmPaK50axis.jpg
 https://i.imgur.com/u9XgGoi.jpg

75 mm artillery
World War II anti-tank guns of Germany
Infantry guns
World War II field artillery